Henry Charles Otter (1807 – 26 March 1876) was a Royal Navy officer and hydrographic surveyor, noted for his work in charting Scotland in the mid-19th century. He was active in surveying in the Baltic Sea during the war with Russia (1853-6) and in supporting the laying of the first transatlantic telegraph cable in 1858.

Biography

Henry Otter was born in Derbyshire in 1807. He joined the Royal Navy in January 1822, and passed his examination in 1828. In 1832, as lieutenant, he was appointed assistant to Lieutenant Michael Slater in surveying the north-east coast of England.

The survey then moved on to Scotland, where Slater died, in February 1842, falling from Holborn Head, a headland near Scrabster, very likely by suicide. Otter then took charge of the survey of Scotland, which occupied him for most of the next twenty years, and resulted in the publication of over 40 Admiralty charts. He was elected a Fellow of the Royal Astronomical Society in November 1842. As well as charting the waters and coast of Scotland, the survey covered the terrain for three miles inland. As the Ordnance Survey had yet to reach most of Scotland, the Admiralty survey provided the first accurate maps for many coastal regions, including the Cuillin Hills of Skye and the Small Isles

During the war with Russia, Otter in HMS Alban took part in the surveys carried out in the Baltic, under the command of Bartholomew Sulivan, in support of fleet operations. The most successful action was the capture and destruction of the fort at Bomarsund, located where the Gulf of Finland and the Gulf of Bothnia join the Baltic, in August 1854. The surveys of the channels between the various islands of Åland were crucial in enabling the transport of the French and British troops to their landing places. Otter was promoted to captain in September 1854. The following year, Otter was in command of HMS Firefly. Both ships were damaged, but neither was put out of action. This was one of the first successful uses of mines in naval warfare. In early August, Firefly bombarded Brandon, the port and shipbuilding centre near Vasa, destroying the magazines and also capturing several vessels and stores.

In 1858 he and Porcupine crossed the Atlantic to assist in the laying of the first transatlantic telegraph cable. The western terminus of the cable was at Bull Arm, Trinity Bay, Newfoundland. Otter surveyed the area, then guided the cable ship into the bay. The ships' crews then had to carry the cable to the station, about half a mile inland. The onward connections between the station on Trinity Bay and existing networks in Canada and the USA had already been made, and connection was soon established between London and New York. However within a few weeks the signals weakened, then disappeared. The insulation of the cable proved not to be satisfactory. Though the cable had failed, the laying was not at fault, and the practicality of the project was established. Technical advances would lead to the successful cable in 1866.

Otter and his wife Jemima made their home in Scotland, buying Manor House, in Oban, in 1845. Otter was a frequent visitor to the remote islands of St Kilda, not always on Admiralty business. On one occasion, he rescued the factor and his crew, whose boat had been wrecked in Village Bay, and who otherwise would have had to stay on the Island for the winter. He shipped fish for the islanders, sold them on the mainland, and passed the proceeds back to them. He transported Free Church ministers to the Island. Infant mortality on St Kilda was high, the "eight-day sickness", and Otter believed that this was due to a diet that was high in oils, particularly from fulmars. When Ann Gillies, A St Kilda woman, was expecting a child in 1860, Henry and Jemima encouraged her in a diet of cocoa, meat and biscuit. After eleven years, Ann and her husband Norman had only two surviving children. This child survived and throve. The grateful couple called the child Mary Jemima Otter Gillies. Unfortunately diet turned out not to be the solution for infant mortality in general. In October 1860 there was a great storm that affected much of western and northern Europe. Otter was in St Kilda at the time, and witnessed its devastating effects on boats, on houses in the village, and on crops, though Porcupine survived. When a relief fund was successfully launched in Glasgow and the west of Scotland, distribution was entrusted to Otter.

Otter retired with the rank of rear-admiral in 1870, and died in Hampshire, England, in 1876.

References

Bibliography

 Sixth Edition 1911: Part I; Part II.

External links
 Coasts of Scotland on marine charts, 1580s-1900s at the National Library of Scotland.

Further reading

Royal Navy rear admirals
1807 births
1876 deaths